Cycling at the 2013 Games of the Small States of Europe was held from 28–31 May 2013 in Cessange, Luxembourg.

Medal summary

Medal table

Men

Women

References

External links
Site of the 2013 Games of the Small States of Europe
Result book

2013 in road cycling
2013 Games of the Small States of Europe
2013 in men's road cycling
2013 in women's road cycling
2013
2013 in mountain biking
2013 in cycle racing